"The Cold Equations" is the fifty-first episode and the sixteenth episode of the third season (1988–89) of the television series The Twilight Zone. It was based on Tom Godwin's classic science fiction short story of the same name. The short story has had a number of adaptations, beginning with an episode of the radio anthology series X Minus One in 1955.

Plot
Thomas Barton is an astronaut delivering vaccines to a plague-stricken colony world. A teenager named Marilyn has stowed away on his vessel with hopes of reuniting with her brother Gerry at the colony, having not seen him in five years. She was unaware that spaceships are only loaded with enough fuel to carry their designated cargo to their destination and account for potential atmospheric disruptions, so policy of necessity dictates that all stowaways must be jettisoned into space, where they die. After ship sensors detect the unauthorized weight, Thomas prods Marilyn out of hiding. Not wanting her to die for her ignorant mistake, Thomas calls control for assistance, but there are no other ships which can pick her up prior to a fatal expenditure of fuel.

They attempt to compensate by jettisoning all possible extra weight. However, the weight jettisoned is only half of what they need to make it to the colony planet. Thomas also points out that she could not survive by sacrificing him, since she is unable to pilot the ship herself.

Thomas puts out a call for Gerry, allowing Marilyn to talk to him one last time and say her farewells. Resigned to her fate, Marilyn enters the airlock and allows herself to be jettisoned into space, leaving Barton to grieve in silence.

External links
 

1989 American television episodes
The Twilight Zone (1985 TV series season 3) episodes
Fiction set in the 2050s

fr:L'Équation de la mort